Darlington Covered Bridge is a historic covered bridge located in Franklin Township, Montgomery County, Indiana. It was built in 1868, and is a single span, Howe truss covered bridge that spans Sugar Creek. It measures 166 feet long and has an overall width of 22 feet.

It was listed on the National Register of Historic Places in 1990.

References

Covered bridges on the National Register of Historic Places in Indiana
Bridges completed in 1868
Transportation buildings and structures in Montgomery County, Indiana
National Register of Historic Places in Montgomery County, Indiana
Road bridges on the National Register of Historic Places in Indiana
Wooden bridges in Indiana
Howe truss bridges in the United States